Aseptic White released with "Dreamcell_11/Aural Music" is the first full-length album of the Italian industrial metal band Digitalis Purpurea. Recorded in winter 2007/2008, was released on October 2, 2008 with a worldwide distribution.

Artwork
The artwork was realized in Spring 2008 by the graphic artist and photographer Anna Taschini. The theme is focused on the aseptic atmosphere recreated with the modular use of colors, mainly red and white, with references to Japanese culture.

Track listing
All songs written by Pi Greco.
"Intro" - 3:16
"Coded Feel" - 4:39
"We're All Stars On Our Snuff Suicide" - 3:18
"Religious Mercy" - 4:26
"Not (Cut-Ups From A Criminal Profiling)" - 4:51
"Crittodream" - 4:01
"Dried Up And Spotted With Black Lipstick" - 4:45

Bonus tracks
"Ideomatic" (Rockets cover) featuring Celine Cecilia Angel, Sanguis et Cinis - 4:36
"Maneater" (Nelly Furtado cover) featuring Tying Tiffany - 4:19

Ghost track
"Rotten Meal - 9:41

Video
"Coded Feel" - MPD Production 2007

Personnel
Digitalis Purpurea
Pi Greco – Vocals, Guitar, Bass guitar, Synthesizer, Drum machine, Songwriter, Producer
C-Power - Guitar

Production
Victor Love from Dope Stars Inc. - Mix and mastering except "Maneater" mixed by Pi Greco 
Tying Tiffany - Female vocals on "Maneater"
Celine Cecilia Angel, Sanguis et Cinis - Female vocals on "Ideomatic"
Track 01 "Intro" contains excerpts of the dialogue from the film π by Darren Aronofsky
Anna Lucylle Taschini - Graphic Design, cover photography
Sea of Sin - Cover model

Reviews
Metal.it  link
Dark Entries  link
Metal Hammer Grecee 
Goth Master 
Scream Magazine 
Metal Rage  link
Lords of Metal.nl  link
MetalItalia.com  link
Metal Hammer Italy 
Loudvision  link
Imhotep.no  link
Metallus  link
Heavy Metal.it  link

Aseptic White was included in Darkentries' top 10 electro rock acts for the year 2009.

Notes

External links

2008 albums
Digitalis Purpurea (band) albums